Tears of Gaza is a 2010 Norwegian anti-war film concerning the Gaza War as seen through the eyes of a group of Palestinian children. The documentary was directed by Vibeke Løkkeberg.

The film is based on the imagery taken by people themselves in Gaza while the war continued, with some additional material from the few foreign journalists who were present while the conflict unfolded. Løkkeberg was not present in Gaza during the war.

Screenings, awards
In 2011 the film was shown for an Israeli audience in Jerusalem Film Festival.

Tears of Gaza received the Gold Award under the Gaza Film Festival and the prize money from this award was presented to the Palestinian children who had been in the film.

The film received the Human Rights Award (Public Liberties and Human Rights Award) for best feature film in Al Jazeera International Documentary Festival in Doha in April 2011.

Reviews

References

External links
 Official website
 

Anti-war films
Israeli–Palestinian conflict films
Norwegian war drama films
Films set in the Gaza Strip
2010 films
2010s political films
2010s war films
2010s Norwegian-language films